Finger Peaks is a granitic mountain summit with an elevation of  located in the Sierra Nevada mountain range, in northern California, United States. The three peaks are situated in Yosemite National Park and Tuolumne County. The landform is set immediately west of Burro Pass, 1.5 mile south of Eocene Peak, and 1.4 mile southwest of Matterhorn Peak. The first ascent of the summit was made July 19, 1931, by Jules Eichorn, Glen Dawson, and Walter Brem. This landform's toponym has been in publications since at least 1925, and was officially adopted by the U.S. Board on Geographic Names in 1932.

Climate
According to the Köppen climate classification system, Finger Peaks is located in an alpine climate zone. Most weather fronts originate in the Pacific Ocean, and travel east toward the Sierra Nevada mountains. As fronts approach, they are forced upward by the peaks (orographic lift), causing moisture in the form of rain or snowfall to drop onto the range. Precipitation runoff from this landform drains north into Piute Creek which is a tributary of the Tuolumne River, and south into Matterhorn Creek which is also part of the Tuolumne drainage basin.

See also
 
 Geology of the Yosemite area
 Tuolumne Intrusive Suite

References

External links
 Weather forecast: Finger Peaks
 Finger Peaks (photo): Flickr

Mountains of Tuolumne County, California
North American 3000 m summits
Mountains of Northern California
Sierra Nevada (United States)
Mountains of Yosemite National Park